Fiji–Mexico relations are the foreign relations between Fiji and Mexico. Both nations are members of the United Nations.

History
Fiji and Mexico established diplomatic relations on 31 August 1975. Mexico soon accredited its embassy in Canberra, Australia to Fiji. Relations between Fiji and Mexico have been limited, taking place primarily in multilateral forums such as at the United Nations.

In April 2014, Fijian Foreign Minister Inoke Kubuabola paid a visit to Mexico to attend the first Global Partnership for Effective Development Co-operation (GPEDC) summit in Mexico City. In January 2017, a group of 17 Mexican Senators, led by Senator Manuel Cavazos Lerma, attended the 25th Asia Pacific Parliamentary Forum held in Suva, Fiji.

Since 2014, the Mexican government offers each year scholarships for nationals of Fiji to study postgraduate studies at Mexican higher education institutions.

High-level visits
High-level visits from Fiji to Mexico
 Foreign Minister Inoke Kubuabola (2014)

High-level visits from Mexico to Fiji
 Senator Manuel Cavazos Lerma (2017)

Trade
In 2018, trade between Fiji and Mexico totaled US$5.8 million. Fiji's main exports to Mexico include: drinking water (Fiji Water); tunas; household goods and corals. Mexico's main exports to Fiji include: kneaders, mixers, mills and crushers; body deodorants and antiperspirants; modular circuits; sardines; malt beer; and crockery.

Diplomatic missions
 Fiji is accredited to Mexico from its embassy in Washington, D.C., United States.
 Mexico is accredited to Fiji from its embassy in Canberra, Australia and maintains an honorary consulate in Suva.

References 

 
Mexico
Fiji